Vero Beach High School (VBHS) is a 9–12 public high school in Vero Beach, Florida, United States that was established in 1925. The school is operated by the Indian River County School District.

The combination of school enrollment and the size of the physical plant makes VBHS the largest high school in Indian River County. The Freshman Learning Center serves about 750 9th grade students.

History 

Vero Beach High School can trace its timeline back to the class of 1905, where students learned in a one-room schoolhouse. In 1925, the first official Vero Beach High School opened. It was located about a half-mile north of the current location, where Vero Beach High School's Freshman Learning Center stands today.

After Vero Beach High School moved to its present-day location in 1963, the old high school became Vero Beach Junior High School, and VBHS took on a new official name, Vero Beach Senior High School.

In 1977, the junior high school was becoming insufficient for housing all of the county's junior high schoolers, and was torn down to make way for a new, smaller school, Indian River Middle 8 - the present-day home of the Freshman Learning Center, and soon to become a middle school again, once all the renovations at Vero Beach High School are complete. Prior to the completion of Sebastian River High School in 1994, Vero Beach High School was the only public high school in Indian River County.

Vero Beach High School completed a three-year, $51 million remodeling project in 2009.

Shawn O'Keefe took over for the 2012–2013 school year.

Academics 

Vero Beach High School has an AP Program, a Dual Enrollment program with Indian River State College, an Honors program, and regular level classes.

The Dual Enrollment Program is offered with Indian River State College to give students the opportunity to take college-level classes at the college, online, or during the summer. The school also offers career and technical classes.

Athletics
On January 1, 2019, the Vero Beach High School Fighting Indians Band performed in the 2019 London New Year's Day Parade in London. This was the first time the band, in its 90 years existence as of June 2019, had gone overseas to Europe and Internationally traveled. This had also brought some attention to the high school and the city of Vero Beach due to the number of viewers at the parade and on TV. In October 2022, The football team was featured on NBC's Today show.

Lacrosse Championships
Spanning the period of 2006-2015, the VBHS Girls Lacrosse team won the statewide Lacrosse Championship every consecutive season. This nine year dynasty was unprecedented in the sport and extremely rare when compared across all Floridian high school teams in any sport. The city honored this dynasty by erecting two signs noting the achievement.

Notable alumni 

 Jade Cargill, professional wrestler
 Alex Cobb, MLB player
 Dale Dawkins, NFL player
 Scotty Emerick, country music singer
 Barry Fanaro, Emmy Award-winning writer
 Mardy Fish, Olympic silver medal-winning tennis player
 Kenny Holmes, NFL player
 Muni Long, Grammy-winning R&B artist
 YNW Melly, rapper
 Alison Mosshart, singer and songwriter, bands The Kills and Dead Weather
 Zeke Motta, NFL player
 Jake Owen, country music singer
 Gary Parris, NFL player
 Albert Reed, model and Dancing With the Stars contestant
 Stephen Root, actor
 Eric Smith, NFL player
 Daleroy Stewart, NFL player
 James Stewart, NFL player
 Bryan Stork, NFL player
 Terry Taylor, professional wrestler
 John Terry, actor

References

External links

Buildings and structures in Vero Beach, Florida
Educational institutions established in 1925
1925 establishments in Florida
High schools in Indian River County, Florida
Indian River County School District
Public high schools in Florida